Flick NBA Basketball is a basketball video game developed and published by Freeverse.  It was released on April 27, 2009 for the iOS.  The game was the first for the platform to be officially licensed by the NBA, and is a part of Freeverse's Flick Sports series of games.

References

External links
Freeverse official website
Flick NBA Basketball official website

2009 video games
Freeverse Inc. games
IOS games
IOS-only games
National Basketball Association video games
Single-player video games
Video games developed in the United States